Mike Tyson vs. Evander Holyfield, billed as Finally, was a professional boxing match fought between Evander Holyfield and Mike Tyson for the WBA heavyweight championship on November 9, 1996, at the MGM Grand Garden Arena in Paradise, Nevada. The bout was Tyson's first defense of the WBA title that he had won from Bruce Seldon on September 7 of that year.

The referee officiating the fight was Mitch Halpern. The fight was promoted by Don King Productions and carried on pay-per-view by Showtime.

The bout was the first fight pitting the two boxers against each other and it would be followed up with a controversial rematch.

Background

Early years
Tyson and Holyfield got acquainted while preparing for the 1984 Summer Olympics, being both on the "losing squad," second-ranked substitutes for their much higher regarded No. 1 teammates. However, Holyfield managed to beat Ricky Womack twice and qualify into the Olympic team, while Tyson did not make it, losing on points to Henry Tillman.

Afterward, Tyson took steps to become a power in the heavyweight division while Holyfield went on to win the bronze medal in Los Angeles. In 1986, Tyson became the youngest fighter ever to win a world heavyweight championship when he knocked Trevor Berbick out in the second round to win the WBC title as part of an ongoing series of fights designed to unify the belts of the WBA, WBC, and the IBF and create an undisputed world champion. The next year, Tyson won the other two championships to become the first fighter since Leon Spinks to be an undisputed world heavyweight champion.

Holyfield came up through the ranks of the light heavyweight division before making his name as a cruiserweight. In what was still a relatively young division — having only been sanctioned as a title-holding weight class since 1979 — Holyfield quickly became its first undisputed champion when he won all three major sanctioning bodies' titles. He moved up to heavyweight in 1988 and continued to work his way up the rankings. By 1990, he was looking to challenge Tyson and after some hard negotiating the two fighters would agree to a fight later that year.

Tyson's loss to Buster Douglas, which he had intended as a tune-up fight for the Holyfield match, derailed those plans. Holyfield was given the first shot at the new champion and won in a third-round knockout. Tyson, meanwhile, entered into a fight with Canadian heavyweight contender Donovan Ruddock with the winner to face Holyfield. However, a controversial ending to the fight, which Tyson won by technical knockout, led to an immediate rematch and further delayed the showdown between Tyson and Holyfield. After Tyson won decisively, a fight was signed for November 18, 1991. An injury and Tyson's subsequent conviction for rape in 1992 indefinitely shelved the fight, as Tyson was sentenced to six years in prison.

Present day
Holyfield, meanwhile, went on to reign as undisputed champion until losing to Riddick Bowe in November 1992. He would regain the WBA and IBF titles from Bowe in a rematch the following year, then lost them to Michael Moorer in 1994. Holyfield was then forced to retire due to a misdiagnosed heart condition, only to come back a year later. He fought Bowe one more time in the fall, getting knocked out for the first time in his career, and then fought overmatched former cruiserweight world champion Bobby Czyz and knocked him out.

Tyson was released from prison in 1995 and resumed his career with great fanfare. He fought journeyman Peter McNeeley in his first fight and then, before a national television audience, knocked out fringe contender Buster Mathis, Jr. The WBC installed him as its number one contender and ordered the winner of a fight between Oliver McCall, their champion who knocked out Lennox Lewis in 1994, and Frank Bruno, a veteran British contender who had fought and lost to Tyson during his first run as champion, to fight him in their next bout. Bruno defeated McCall by decision, but then was soundly beaten by Tyson within three rounds.

Tyson would be stripped of the title for agreeing to fight WBA champion Bruce Seldon in his next fight instead of Lewis, the top contender. He knocked Seldon out in the first round and a fight was set up with Holyfield, who despite his former championship pedigree was regarded as past his prime.

Preparing to fight Tyson, Holyfield employed Mike Weaver, the WBA ex-champion, as a personal assistant. He also employed David Tua, whose style and anthropometrics were close to Tyson's, as a sparring partner.

Undercard
Showtime promoted the event as a heavyweight title tripleheader, as two other champions were defending their titles that night as well. In all, five (including Tyson's ) were contested for that night.

Another promoted fight featured star women's boxer Christy Martin, who had gained some notoriety and was becoming a star; she defeated Bethany Payne by knockout in the first round.

Undefeated WBC world minimumweight champion Ricardo Lopez knocked out contender Morgan Ndumo in the sixth round to retain his title.

WBA super bantamweight champion Antonio Cermeno defeated challenger Eddy Saenz after his opponent decided not to continue following the fifth round.

The first of the three heavyweight title fights followed. The IBF title match was contested with Michael Moorer taking on Francois Botha. Moorer had defeated Axel Schulz earlier in 1996 for the title that had been stripped from lineal champion George Foreman; Botha had defeated Schulz in an earlier fight for the vacant title but the result was vacated following a doping violation. Moorer knocked the previously undefeated Botha out in the final round to retain the title.

The last fight before the main event was contested for the WBO championship. Henry Akinwande, a British fighter who defeated Jeremy Williams for the title Riddick Bowe vacated to set up the third and last fight with Holyfield, took on former NABF champion Alexander Zolkin. Akinwande emerged victorious with a tenth-round knockout in the first defense of his belt.

The fight
Ahead of the fight, the betting odds were 25 to 1 in favor of Tyson.
Tyson came out fast and sent Holyfield reeling with his first solid punch. Holyfield, who had studied Tyson's style intensively, later explained that Tyson dipped to his left, from which position he usually loaded up a left hook, but on this occasion surprised Holyfield by firing a right cross. Holyfield tied Tyson up and revealed the first surprise of the his superior as he pushed Tyson backwards. Tyson would never seriously hurt Holyfield for the remainder of the fight. Holyfield defended effectively for the rest of round one and hammered Tyson with several counterpunches. After the end of the round, Tyson threw a punch after the bell; an unintimidated Holyfield retaliated. In the second, Holyfield drove Tyson into the ropes and stung him with a hard combination, and his strategy for the match became clear. As Tyson mainly threw one punch at a time, Holyfield blocked the first attack, then used his strength to clinch, and shove Tyson backwards. Keeping Tyson on the back foot minimized his power and affected his balance, and gave Holyfield the opportunity to come forward and score with combinations to the head. As the rounds passed, Tyson was unable to adjust, and found himself being thoroughly outboxed. In the fifth round, Tyson landed a fierce combination, his best of the match, and Holyfield did not stagger.

In the sixth round, Tyson was cut by a headbutt from Holyfield that Halpern judged to be accidental. Then, as the round progressed,
Holyfield caught Tyson with a left that dropped him to the canvas. This was the first time Tyson had been knocked down since his lone defeat, and  Holyfield continued parrying Tyson's charges and catching him with punches to the head. With 15 seconds left in the seventh round, Tyson lunged at Holyfield as Holyfield came forward, resulting in a hard clash of heads. Tyson cried out in pain and his knees buckled, but again the referee judged the headbutt to be unintentional. Tyson was examined by the ring doctor, and tied Holyfield up for the rest of the round. During the next two rounds, Tyson continued missing wild punches and absorbing counterpunches from Holyfield. At the end of the tenth round, a punch from Holyfield sent Tyson staggering across the ring. Holyfield chased him into the ropes and landed a series of devastating blows. By the sound of the bell, Tyson was out on his feet and defenseless, but his corner allowed him out for the eleventh. Holyfield quickly landed another brutal extended combination, sending Tyson back into the ropes.

Halpern had seen enough, and he stopped the fight, giving Holyfield one of the most famous upset victories in the history of boxing. Holyfield also became the first person since Muhammad Ali to win a heavyweight championship belt three times, although, unlike Ali, Holyfield's third championship win had not been for the  lineal heavyweight title, which was at that time held by George Foreman. At the post-fight press conference, Tyson addressed Holyfield: "Thank you very much. I have the greatest respect for you."

See also
Evander Holyfield vs. Mike Tyson II

References

External links
Katsilometes, John.,  Holyfield knocks fight out of Tyson, Las Vegas Review-Journal, 1996-11-10, Retrieved on 2007-04-19.
Hawk, Joe., Holyfield keeps promise, stuns boxing world in process, Las Vegas Review-Journal, 1996-11-10, Retrieved on 2007-04-19.

World Boxing Association heavyweight championship matches
1996 in boxing
Boxing in Las Vegas
Boxing on Showtime
1996 in sports in Nevada
History of boxing
Tyson 1
Holyfield
November 1996 sports events in the United States
MGM Grand Garden Arena